Clementi Constituency was a constituency in Singapore. It used to exist from 1980 to 1988, where it merged into Pasir Panjang Group Representation Constituency in 1988. It was carved out from Bukit Timah constituency in 1980.

Member of Parliament

Elections

Elections in 1980s

References

Singaporean electoral divisions
Clementi
Constituencies established in 1980
Constituencies disestablished in 1988